KIHL-LP (103.7 FM) is a radio station licensed to Hilo, Hawaii, United States, the station serves the Hilo area.  The station airs a format consisting of Christian talk and teaching and Jazz and is currently owned by Calvary Chapel Hilo.

References

External links
 

IHL-LP
Radio stations established in 2007
IHI-LP